Riffenkopf is a 1,748 m high mountain in the Allgäu Alps in Bavaria, Germany. It is the first distinct summit on the ridge separating the Oy and Dietersbach valleys.

There are no marked hiking trails on the Riffenkopf. Locals make use of hunting trails to reach the summit, but the route is overgrown and difficult to find.

References 

 Thaddäus Steiner: Allgäuer Bergnamen, Lindenberg, Kunstverlag Josef Fink, 2007, ISBN 978-3-89870-389-5
 Thaddäus Steiner: Die Flurnamen der Gemeinde Oberstdorf im Allgäu, München, Selbstverlag des Verbandes für Flurnamenforschung in Bayern, 1972
 Zettler/Groth: Alpenvereinsführer Allgäuer Alpen. München, Bergverlag Rudolf Rother 1984. ISBN 3-7633-1111-4

Mountains of Bavaria
Mountains of the Alps